is a railway station on the Tobu Tojo Line in Itabashi, Tokyo, Japan, operated by the private railway operator Tobu Railway.

Lines
Rapid, Express, Semi Express, and Local services stop at this station.

Station layout
The station consists of two island platforms serving four tracks. Platforms 2 and 4 are used to allow faster trains to overtake slower stopping trains. This station has a season ticket sales office.

Platforms

History

The station opened on 1 May 1914 coinciding with the opening of the Tojo Railway line from Ikebukuro.

From 17 March 2012, station numbering was introduced on the Tobu Tojo Line, with Narimasu Station becoming "TJ-10".

Passenger statistics
In fiscal 2014, the station was used by an average of 57,729 passengers daily. Passenger figures for previous years (boarding passengers only) are as shown below.

Surrounding area

North side
 Narimasu Library
 Itabashi Art Museum
 Akatsuka No. 2 Junior High School
 Akatsuka Elementary School
 Akatsuka Park

South side
 Chikatetsu-Narimasu Station (on the Tokyo Metro Yurakucho Line and Tokyo Metro Fukutoshin Line)
 Hokei Junior High School
 Narimasu Elementary School
 Hikarigaoka Park

See also
 List of railway stations in Japan

References

External links

 Tobu station information 

Tobu Tojo Main Line
Stations of Tobu Railway
Railway stations in Tokyo
Railway stations in Japan opened in 1914